was a Japanese swimmer. He competed in the men's 200 metre breaststroke event at the 1928 Summer Olympics.

References

External links
 

1909 births
Year of death missing
Olympic swimmers of Japan
Swimmers at the 1928 Summer Olympics
Place of birth missing
Japanese male breaststroke swimmers
20th-century Japanese people